Abdulrahman Omari Kinana is a Tanzanian politician who served as the first Speaker of the East African Legislative Assembly from 2001 to 2006. He has been secretary-general of Chama Cha Mapinduzi, the ruling party, from 2012 to 2018.

Background:

Kinana served in the Tanzanian Armed Forces for 20 years before retiring as a colonel in 1992.
He has also served as the Deputy Minister of Foreign Affairs and Minister of Defence. He was a member of the Tanzanian Parliament for Arusha constituency for 10 years. Kinana's father moved to Tanzania when he was a child and hails from Somali Sheekhaal clan.

References

External links

Living people
1951 births
Chama Cha Mapinduzi politicians
Chama Cha Mapinduzi MPs
Government ministers of Tanzania
Defense ministers of Tanzania
Members of the East African Legislative Assembly
People from Arusha District